Marie Saine-Firdaus (born 1973) is a Gambian lawyer and politician.

Early life
Born on 25 April 1973, Firdaus did her schooling in Banjul before receiving her Bachelor of Law degree from the International Islamic University Malaysia in 2000. She did her LLM in human rights from the University of Pretoria (2006).

Career
After completing her graduation, Firdaus became a state counsel in November 2000. Later in 2007, she served as a legal adviser to the President's Office in Gambia. On 14 September 2007, the Gambian president Yahya Jammeh appointed her the Secretary of State for Justice and Attorney General of the Gambia. She replaced Kebba Sanyang. The following month, Firdaus headed a Gambian delegation sent to Taiwan. She was one of the recipients of the title Officer of the National Order of the Republic of The Gambia, conferred by Jammeh in May 2009. She was succeeded by Edward A. Gomez.

In 2011, a corruption case involving 880,250.00 Gambian dalasi was filed against Firdaus at the Banjul Magistrates’ Court. 

She is a member of the Female Lawyers Association of The Gambia.

References

1973 births
Living people
21st-century Gambian women politicians
21st-century Gambian politicians
Gambian women lawyers
International Islamic University Malaysia alumni
University of Pretoria alumni
Alliance for Patriotic Reorientation and Construction politicians
Female justice ministers
Government ministers of the Gambia
Women government ministers of the Gambia
21st-century Gambian lawyers